Erwin Ilz (12 May 1891 – 12 May 1954) was an Austrian architect. His work was part of the architecture event in the art competition at the 1936 Summer Olympics.

With his partner Erwin Böck, Ilz won second prize in a competition to design New Belgrade.

References

1891 births
1954 deaths
20th-century Austrian architects
Olympic competitors in art competitions
Architects from Vienna